Wirephoto, telephotography or radiophoto is the sending of pictures by telegraph, telephone or radio.

Édouard Belin's Bélinographe of 1913, which scanned using a photocell and transmitted over ordinary phone lines, formed the basis for the Wirephoto service. In Europe, services similar to a wirephoto were called a Belino.

Western Union transmitted its first halftone photograph in 1921. AT&T followed in 1924, and RCA sent a Radiophoto in 1926. The Associated Press began its Wirephoto service in 1935 and held a trademark on the term AP Wirephoto between 1963 and 2004. The first AP photo sent by wire depicted the crash of a small plane in New York's Adirondack Mountains.

Technologically and commercially, the wirephoto was the successor to Ernest A. Hummel's Telediagraph of 1895, which had transmitted electrically scanned shellac-on-foil originals over a dedicated circuit connecting the New York Herald and the Chicago Times Herald, the St. Louis Republic, the Boston Herald, and the Philadelphia Inquirer.

The first wirephoto systems were slow and did not reproduce well. In 1929, Dr. Vladimir Zworykin, an electronics engineer working for Western Electric, came up with a system that produced a better reproduction and could transmit a full page in approximately one minute.

In the 1930s, wirephoto machines of any reasonable speed were very large and expensive and required a dedicated phone line. News media firms like Associated Press used expensive leased telephone lines to transmit wirephotos. In the mid-1930s a technology battle began for less expensive portable wirephoto equipment that could transmit photos over standard phone lines. A prototype device in the experimental stage was available in San Francisco in 1935 when the large Navy airship USS Macon crashed into the Pacific Ocean off the coast of California.  A photo was taken and transmitted to New York City over regular phone lines. Later, a wirephoto copier and transmitter that could be carried anywhere and needed only a standard long-distance phone line was put into use by International News Photos.

During the U.S. leaflet dropping campaign aimed towards the then Empire of Japan, near the end of WWII, Honolulu would transmit some radiophoto images to Saipan depicting proposed leaflet messages for the printing press on Saipan to produce.

After World War II at haute couture shows in Paris, Frederick L. Milton would sketch runway designs and transmit his sketches via Belinograph to his subscribers, who could then copy Parisian fashions. In 1955, four major French couturiers (Lanvin, Dior, Patou, and Jacques Fath) sued Milton for piracy, and the case went to the Appellate Division of the New York Supreme Court. Wire photo enabled a speed of transmission that the French designers argued damaged their businesses.

See also
Frederick Bakewell
Alexander Bain
Giovanni Caselli
Fax
Hellschreiber
Pantelegraph
SSTV

Footnotes

Further reading
 "Pictorial Telegraphy," Literary Digest, vol. 10, no. 19 (March 9, 1895), pg. 14.

Extern link

Telecommunication services
History of telecommunications
Photojournalism